Samen Mashhad Basketball Club is an Iranian professional basketball club based in Mashhad, Iran. It competes in the Iranian Basketball Super League.

History
Samen was founded in 2011 and is owned by Tarh Maskan Samen, a housing investment company. Samen initially played in the Khorasan Razavi Basketball League then played in the Iranian Second and First Divisions and, in 2014, was promoted to the Iranian Basketball Super League.

Tournament records

Khorasan Razavi Basketball League
 2011: 4th place

Tarh Maskan Samen Basketball Tournament
2012: Champions

Iranian Basketball Second Division
 2011–12: 6th place
 2012–13: 4th place

Iranian Basketball First Division
 2013–14: 3rd place

Iranian Super League
 2014–15: ?
 2015–16: 5th place

Roster

Coaches
  Mehdi Sahebian (2014–2015)
  Mehran Hatami (2015–2016)
  Mehdi Sahebian (2016-)

Notable former players

References

External links

Basketball teams in Iran
Sport in Mashhad
Basketball teams established in 2011